Bernhard Glass (born 6 November 1957) is an East German former luger who competed in the late 1970s and early 1980s. He won the gold medal in the men's singles event at the 1980 Winter Olympics in Lake Placid, New York.

Glass also won a bronze medal in the men's singles event at the 1979 FIL European Luge Championships in Oberhof, East Germany.

After his retirement from luge as an athlete, Glass became a luge coach. Among his famous pupils in luge were Silke Kraushaar, Tatjana Hüfner, and David Möller while others who started in luge, but later went to bobsleigh included André Lange and Sandra Kiriasis. In July 2010, Glass became a coach of the Canadian Luge Association.

References
 Canadian Luge Association Bolsters Coaching Staff with New German Recruit. at the Fédération Internationale de Luge de Course (30 July 2010 article accessed 15 August 2010.)
 
 
  

1957 births
Living people
German male lugers
Lugers at the 1980 Winter Olympics
Olympic gold medalists for East Germany
Olympic lugers of East Germany
Olympic medalists in luge
National People's Army military athletes
Medalists at the 1980 Winter Olympics